is a Japanese professional baseball infielder for the Orix Buffaloes in Japan's Nippon Professional Baseball.

He selected .

References

External links

NPB.com

1988 births
Baseball people from Gunma Prefecture
Living people
Japanese baseball players
Jobu University alumni
Nippon Professional Baseball second basemen
Nippon Professional Baseball shortstops
Nippon Professional Baseball third basemen
Orix Buffaloes players
People from Takasaki, Gunma